is a truss cantilever bridge across Tokyo Bay in Kōtō, Tokyo, Japan.

History
Part of a new four-lane highway ringing Tokyo, construction began in 2002 and was scheduled for completion in 2011, but the opening to traffic was delayed until 2012. With the provisional name of  the public was asked for suggestions. From the 12,223 received, "Tokyo Gate Bridge" was chosen and officially announced on 15 November 2010.

Design
The design fulfils the requirement to be high enough to allow large ships to pass underneath, but low enough not to interfere with air traffic to the nearby Haneda Airport. It is a double cantilever bridge, which means that the truss sections from either side can be completed in balance, and then joined by the addition of the relatively short central span. The resemblance of the bridge to two monsters facing off has given it the nickname of

Gallery

Others
Visitors can take an elevator to the sidewalk on this bridge and walk on the sidewalk from Wakasu to Central Breakwater. But, you can only take an elevator to the sidewalk and the ground from Wakasu Gate, because Central Breakwater Gate is closed, so you cannot take an elevator to sidewalk and ground from Central Breakwater.

If you want to only see the bridge, you go to Wakasu Seaside Park and Central Breakwater.

Access
You can use Wakasu Seaside Park Bus stop which 木31 - Shin-Kiba Station（Toei Bus） passes through.
You can also use Central Breakwater Bus stop which 波01 - Tokyo Teleport Station（Toei Bus）passes through.
※From Central Breakwater gate you cannot walk on the bridge.

References

External links
 Official Tokyo Metropolitan Government page about the bridge 
 
 
 
 
 

Truss bridges
Cantilever bridges
Bridges in Japan
Bridges completed in 2012
Buildings and structures in Koto, Tokyo